The 1935 football season was São Paulo's 6th season since the club's founding in 1930.

Statistics

Scorers

Overall

{|class="wikitable"
|-
|Games played || 5 (Friendly match)
|-
|Games won || 3 (Friendly match)
|-
|Games drawn || 2 (Friendly match)
|-
|Games lost || 0 (Friendly match)
|-
|Goals scored || 10
|-
|Goals conceded || 6
|-
|Goal difference || +4
|-
|Best result || 3–1 (A) v Corinthians - Friendly match - 1935.03.24
|-
|Worst result || 
|-
|Most appearances || 
|-
|Top scorer || Luizinho (5)
|-

Friendlies

External links
official website 

Association football clubs 1935 season
1935
1935 in Brazilian football